"Painkiller" is a song by Canadian rock band Three Days Grace. This is the first single released with new singer Matt Walst, following the departure of Adam Gontier. It is the lead single off the band's fifth studio album Human.

Background
On March 28, 2014, the band officially announced that Matt Walst would be Adam Gontier's permanent replacement in the band. Within the announcement, it was teased that new music would be heard the following week and on March 31, the band uploaded "Painkiller" onto their YouTube account. The song was officially released through iTunes on April 1. Drummer Neil Sanderson talked about the meaning behind the song in a making of video released on the band's YouTube account:
"Painkiller, that song is about how everybody is addicted to something. It's written from the perspective of the vice that you need to be addicted to it. The love of the drug, it's the villain who taunts you into wanting more."

The song won "Rock Song of the Year" at the 2014 Loudwire Music Awards.

Charts

Weekly charts

Year-end charts

Certifications

References

Three Days Grace songs
2014 songs
2014 singles
Song recordings produced by Gavin Brown (musician)
Songs written by Johnny Andrews
Songs written by Gavin Brown (musician)
Songs written by Neil Sanderson
Songs written by Barry Stock